Erik Sabo (born 22 November 1991) is a Slovak professional footballer who plays as a midfielder for Cypriot First Division club Anorthosis Famagusta.

Club career
Sabo made his debut for Spartak Trnava against Slovan Bratislava on 25 February 2011. He spent one year on loan at Spartak Myjava, playing in the second division.

In August 2015, Spartak Trnava announced Sabo's transfer to PAOK. He signed a four-year contract. On 3 December 2015, Sabo was the MVP of a 6–2 away victory for PAOK over Chania, as Igor Tudor's team advanced to the next round of Greek Cup. Sabo scored three times, while Jairo, Giannis Mystakidis and Dimitris Pelkas marked the visitors' other three goals. He finished the season with 24 appearances and 3 goals in all competitions.

On 16 July 2016, it was announced that Sabo had signed a season-long loan deal with Beitar Jerusalem with an option of making the move permanent set to €400,000. In August 2016 he was linked with a move to 2. Bundesliga club VfL Bochum but had to overpass legal issues due to his signing to Beitar Jerusalem. According to media, Sabo would continue his career with Beitar Jerusalem, as the Israeli club on 1 July 2017 activated the buy-out clause in the player's loan contract. On 22 July 2019, Sabo joined Turkish club Fatih Karagümrük.

Anorthosis Famagusta
On 29 July 2022, Sabo joined Anorthosis Famagusta F.C. of the Cypriot First Division on a two-year deal.

International career
Sabo made his national team debut against Montenegro on 23 May 2014. He appeared frequently in Ján Kozák's nominations, despite not appearing in many of the matches. Kozák, however, resigned in October 2018 and was subsequently replaced by Czech Pavel Hapal. Hapal did not call up Sabo for double UEFA Euro 2020 qualifying fixture against Hungary and Wales, making Sabo's absence from the national team during competitive fixtures the first, since September 2016.

References

External links

Spartak Trnava profile 

Living people
1991 births
People from Trnava District
Sportspeople from the Trnava Region
Slovak footballers
Slovakia under-21 international footballers
Slovakia international footballers
Slovak expatriate footballers
Association football midfielders
Slovak Super Liga players
Super League Greece players
Israeli Premier League players
Süper Lig players
TFF First League players
FC Spartak Trnava players
Spartak Myjava players
PAOK FC players
Beitar Jerusalem F.C. players
Hapoel Be'er Sheva F.C. players
Fatih Karagümrük S.K. footballers
Çaykur Rizespor footballers
Expatriate footballers in Greece
Expatriate footballers in Israel
Expatriate footballers in Turkey
Slovak expatriate sportspeople in Greece
Slovak expatriate sportspeople in Israel
Slovak expatriate sportspeople in Turkey
Hungarians in Slovakia
Slovak people of Hungarian descent